Ivan Alev was a Bulgarian doctor and a worker of the Bulgarian national liberation movement in Macedonia.

He was born in 1851 in the small south Macedonian town of Gumendzhe, in the Ottoman Empire, now Goumenissa, Kilkis regional unit, Greece. He finished medicine in Athens and then returned to his native town, where he started to work as a doctor. Later he moved to Kukush (Kilkis). Alev was a trusted man of Internal Macedonian-Adrianople Revolutionary Organization (IMARO) and had the responsibility to treat the sick and wounded members of the Organization. During the wars for Bulgarian national unification, Alev was a military division doctor in the Bulgarian army. After the First World War he settled in Nevrokop as a regional doctor. He died in 1919.

References

1851 births
1919 deaths
Members of the Internal Macedonian Revolutionary Organization
Bulgarians from Aegean Macedonia
Bulgarian military personnel of the Balkan Wars
Macedonian Bulgarians
19th-century Bulgarian physicians
20th-century Bulgarian physicians
People from Goumenissa